Mediterranea is a genus of  small air-breathing land snails, terrestrial pulmonate gastropods in the family Oxychilidae, the glass snails.

Species
 Mediterranea adamii (Westerlund, 1886)
 Mediterranea aliatahani (A. Riedel, 1984)
 Mediterranea amaltheae (A. Riedel & Subai, 1982)
 Mediterranea depressa (Sterki, 1880)
 Mediterranea hydatina (Rossmässler, 1838)
 Mediterranea inopinata (Uličný, 1887)
 Mediterranea ionica (A. Riedel & Subai, 1978)
 Mediterranea juliae (A. Riedel, 1990)
 Mediterranea montivaga (M. Kimakowicz, 1890)
 Mediterranea planorbis (Möllendorff, 1899)
 Mediterranea planospiroides (A. Riedel, 1969)
 Mediterranea polygyra (Pollonera, 1885)
 Mediterranea pygmaea (A. Riedel, 1983)
 Mediterranea samsunensis (Retowski, 1889)
 Mediterranea serbica (A. Riedel, 1969)
 Mediterranea wiktori (A. Riedel, 1997)
 Mediterranea xylocola Örstan, 2020
Uncertain species
 Mediterranea mariensis E. Gittenberger, 2008
 Mediterranea mylonasi (A. Riedel, 1983)
 Mediterranea pieperi (A. Riedel, 1973)

References

 Schileyko, A. A. (2003). Treatise on Recent terrestrial pulmonate molluscs. Part 10. Ariophantidae, Ostracolethidae, Ryssotidae, Milacidae, Dyakiidae, Staffordiidae, Gastrodontidae, Zonitidae, Daudebardiidae, Parmacellidae. Ruthenica. Supplement 2: 1309-1466. Moskva
 Bank, R. A. (2017). Classification of the Recent terrestrial Gastropoda of the World. Last update: July 16th, 2017

External links

Oxychilidae
Gastropod genera